Nixon in China is an opera by John Adams. 

Nixon in China may also refer to:

1972 visit by Richard Nixon to China
Nixon goes to China, metaphor for an unexpected or uncharacteristic action by a politician
Nixon in China (2006), non-fiction book by Margaret MacMillan